Stuart Joseph Clancy (June 6, 1906 – September 24, 1965) was a quarterback who played in the NFL for the New York Giants from 1932 to 1935.

References

1906 births
1965 deaths
American football quarterbacks
Holy Cross Crusaders football players
New York Giants players
People from Branford, Connecticut
Players of American football from Connecticut